Line 5 of the Dalian Metro, is a rapid transit line in Dalian, Liaoning, China. It runs from the north to the south. The line opened on 17 March 2023.

History
Construction of Line 5 started on 30 March 2017.

The trial operation without passengers began on 1 December 2022.

The line opened on 17 March 2023.

Stations

References

05
Railway lines opened in 2023